Dominic Kirui (born April 1988) is a Kenyan journalist who specializes in climate change, food security, access to water, and gender reporting . He was an IJNET journalist of the year in January 2022 and a graduate of media and communications from Mount Kenya University. 

He has written and photographed for several publications in Europe, America, Asia and Africa; including Thomson Reuters Foundation, The Epoch Times, New York Times, Equal Times, Talk Africa, Foreign Policy, Euronews, amongs others.

International competitions

Personal bests
5000 metres – 13:33.77 min (1997)
10,000 metres – 27:31.10 min (1997)
Half marathon – 1:02:45 hrs (2000)

References

External links

1967 births
Living people
Kenyan male long-distance runners
Kenyan male cross country runners
Olympic athletes of Kenya
Athletes (track and field) at the 1992 Summer Olympics
World Athletics Championships athletes for Kenya
20th-century Kenyan people
21st-century Kenyan people